John Etter Clark (March 29, 1915 – June 3, 1956) was a provincial politician, teacher and farmer from Alberta, Canada. He was a member of the Legislative Assembly of Alberta from 1952 until committing one of the deadliest mass murders in Alberta history and killing himself.

Early life
John Etter Clark was born in Stettler, Alberta in 1915. He became a part-time school teacher and a farmer. Clark inherited the  farm founded by his father. He married Margaret Dinwoodie in 1947 and they had four children.

Political career
Clark ran for a seat in the Alberta Legislature, representing the Stettler district, in the 1952 Alberta general election as a Social Credit candidate. The four-way race was hotly contested, and Clark won on the second vote count to hold the district for his party.

Clark ran for a second term in the 1955 Alberta general election. He won a sizable majority to defeat two other candidates and hold his seat.

Mass murder and subsequent suicide
On June 3, 1956 Pete Parrott, a neighbour residing on a farm leased from Clark next to his farm in Erskine, Alberta, stopped over for a social visit. He found six bodies and one wounded person, each shot at least once through the head with .22 calibre bullets, and one shot multiple times. The wounded victim was taken to a local hospital and died shortly after.

The Royal Canadian Mounted Police descended on the scene with 14 special field agents. Clark had fled and was not among the dead, who included his wife, son, three daughters, a hired farmhand and a visitor. The murder weapon was a single-shot .22 calibre rifle that Clark had borrowed from his uncle. He was expected to travel to Saskatchewan on June 1, 1956, to help manage the Social Credit campaign in the 1956 Saskatchewan general election, but failed to show up without explanation.

Police found Clark's body lying on the edge of a dugout approximately 600 yards (550 m) from the farmhouse where the murders took place. It had wounds from a single self-inflicted bullet through the head and the murder weapon lying at its feet. It was found adorned in night attire as if Clark had been preparing to go to bed. Thirty-two RCMP Officers who travelled the range on horseback with a team of tracking dogs conducted the search. A team of three Mounties on a Royal Canadian Air Force Otter conducted an aerial search. The mounties spotted Clark's body from the air a few hours after the search began.

Clark had previously been hospitalized for a month and a half after a nervous breakdown in 1954, and another during the legislature's 1956 spring session.

It, along with the Cook Family murders in 1959, were the deadliest mass murders in Alberta's history, until Phu Lang killed nine in Edmonton in December 2014.

References

External links
Legislative Assembly of Alberta Members Listing

1915 births
1956 suicides
20th-century criminals
Alberta Social Credit Party MLAs
Canadian farmers
Canadian mass murderers
Canadian murderers of children
Canadian schoolteachers
Familicides
Murder–suicides in Canada
People from the County of Stettler No. 6
Suicides by firearm in Alberta
Mass murder in Alberta